Eric Lee Bergren (April 27, 1954 – July 14, 2016) was an American screenwriter.

Early life and career 
Bergren was born 1954 in Pasadena, California. He studied theatre arts at the University of Southern California.

Based on works of Frederick Treves and Ashley Montagu about Joseph Merrick, Bergren wrote the script for the 1980 film The Elephant Man together with director David Lynch and fellow screenwriter Christopher De Vore. At the 53rd Academy Awards, Bergren, Lynch and De Vore were nominated for an Academy Award for Best Adapted Screenplay. It was also nominated for the Golden Globe Award for Best Screenplay, the BAFTA Award for Best Screenplay and the Writers Guild of America Award for Best Adapted Screenplay.

Together with Christopher De Vore and Nicholas Kazan, Bergren also wrote the script for Frances, a biopic about American actress and television host Frances Farmer.

In 1988, he directed the short film ...They Haven't Seen This..., based on his own script.

Death 
Bergren died on July 14, 2016, aged 62, in Pasadena due to complications from stage 4 liver cancer, which had been diagnosed a few months earlier. He was survived by his ex-wife, Sheila Condit, and two daughters Erin Condit-Bergren and Elysse Condit.

Filmography 
 1980: The Elephant Man
 1982: Frances
 1988: ...They Haven't Seen This... (short)
 1991: The Dark Wind
 1998: Little Girl Fly Away (TV film)

References

External links 
 

1954 births
2016 deaths
20th-century American screenwriters
American male screenwriters
Deaths from cancer in California
Deaths from liver cancer
People from Pasadena, California
Screenwriters from California
20th-century American male writers